Benjamin Prosser (1878 – 1936) was an English footballer who played in the Football League for Bradford City and Stoke.

Career
Prosser was born in Yorkshire and began his career with Leeds before making the move to Stoke in 1902. He played once for Stoke in 1902–03 season which came in a 2–0 loss at Derby County in March 1903. He then moved on to Bradford City where he spent the 1903–04 season scoring five goals in 19 matches for the "Bantams".

Career statistics
Source:

References

English footballers
Bradford City A.F.C. players
Stoke City F.C. players
English Football League players
1878 births
1936 deaths
Association football forwards